Len or Leonard Butt may refer to: 

 Len Butt (footballer, born 1893) (died 1993), English footballer with Southampton and Bournemouth
 Len Butt (footballer, born 1910) (died 1994), English footballer with Huddersfield Town and Blackburn Rovers